The name Plaxton Expressliner or National Expressliner can refer to one of three designs of coach built by Plaxton for National Express use:

 The original Expressliner was a Plaxton Paramount III 3500 to National Express specification, easily recognisable from the standard Paramount by having a windowless rear end incorporating the National Express logo.
 The Expressliner II was a continuation of the same concept using the Plaxton Premiere 350 body, which replaced the Paramount.
 The Paragon Expressliner is based on the Paragon and replaced the Expressliner II in 2000.

Expressliner